5,6-MDO-DiPT, or 5,6-methylenedioxy-N,N-diisopropyltryptamine, is a lesser-known psychedelic drug.  It is the 5,6-methylenedioxy analog of DiPT. 5,6-MDO-DiPT was first synthesized by Alexander Shulgin. It is mentioned in his book TiHKAL (Tryptamines I Have Known and Loved), but 5,6-MDO-DiPT was never tested to determine what effects it produces, if any.  Very little data exists about the pharmacological properties, metabolism, and toxicity of 5,6-MDO-DiPT.

See also 
 4,5-MDO-DiPT
 Tryptamine
 DiPT
 Psychedelics, dissociatives and deliriants

External links 
 5,6-MDO-DiPT Entry in TIHKAL
 5,6-MDO-DIPT Entry in TiHKAL • info

Psychedelic tryptamines
Diisopropylamino compounds